The All Japan Federation of Transport Workers' Unions (Unyu Roren) is a trade union representing workers in the distribution sector, particularly in road goods transportation, in Japan.

The union was established in 1968, and remained independent until 1989, when it joined the new Japanese Trade Union Confederation.  By that point, it had 118,000 members and was one of the 20 largest unions in the country.  By 2020, it had grown to 128,095 members.

References

External links

Transport trade unions in Japan
Trade unions established in 1968
1968 establishments in Japan